F20, F-20, F.XX, or F-XX may refer to:

 F20 manual transmission, a General Motors transmission
 Northrop F-20 Tigershark, a combat aircraft
 Farmall F-20, a model of Farmall tractor
 Fokker F.XX, a Dutch airliner
 Fujifilm FinePix F20, a digital camera
 , a British ship
 Schizophrenia ICD-10 code
 BMW 1 Series (F20)
 A Honda F engine
 Fluorine-20 (F-20 or 20F), an isotope of fluorine
 F20 (full, F20T12) is a very common size of 24" x 1.5" (610mm x 38mm) fluorescent lamp used in many parts of the world.

See also
 F/A-XX, an American development and acquisition program for a sixth-generation jet fighter
 FXX (disambiguation)
 20F (disambiguation)